William of Brunswick may refer to:
 William of Winchester, Lord of Lüneburg (1184–1213)
 William I, Duke of Brunswick-Lüneburg (c. 1270–1292)
 William II, Duke of Brunswick-Lüneburg (1300–1369)
 William the Victorious, Duke of Brunswick-Lüneburg (c. 1392–1482)
 William IV, Duke of Brunswick-Lüneburg (c. 1425–1503)
 William the Younger, Duke of Brunswick-Lüneburg (1535–1592)
 William, Duke of Brunswick-Grubenhagen (c. 1298–1360)
 William Augustus, Duke of Brunswick-Harburg (1564–1642)
 Augustus William, Duke of Brunswick-Wolfenbüttel (1662–1731)
 August Wilhelm, Duke of Brunswick-Bevern (1715–1781)
 Charles William Ferdinand, Duke of Brunswick-Wolfenbüttel (1735–1806)
 Frederick William, Duke of Brunswick-Wolfenbüttel (1771–1815)
 William, Duke of Brunswick (1806–1884)